Caltech Employees Federal Credit Union (CEFCU) is a credit union for the California Institute of Technology family and its affiliate organizations. CEFCU is headquartered in La Cañada Flintridge and is the 25th largest credit union in the state of California. It is also the 156th largest credit union in the nation. The union's savings rates are 73% higher than the national average.

Overview 
Caltech Employees Federal Credit Union was established on 11 April 1950 by seven employees of the California Institute of Technology. At present, it has over 37,000 members with assets above $2 billion. The services offered by CEFCU are share savings accounts, youth savings accounts, real estate and vehicle loans, personal loans, credit card services and others.

CEFCU membership is available to the esteemed Caltech community and members of their immediate families. The credit union makes personal loans at interest rates that usually exceed the interest rates available on short-term accounts at banks or savings institutions.

Caltech Employees Federal Credit Union offers its services nationwide with surcharge-free access to 30,000 ATMs of CO-OP Network. CEFCU also offers online access with eBranch. Its mobile app provides access to accounts to check balances, view transactions, make transfers and deposit checks. CEFCU recently welcomed Thomas F. Rosenbaum as Caltech’s 9th president. CEFCU sponsored TEDxCaltech 2013: The Brain—a one-day, multidisciplinary conference at the California Institute of Technology. CEFCU is also an annual sponsor of Caltech Y’s Act Award.

In 2016, the company announced their new Real Estate Loan Center. The office of the loan center is located at the corner of Foothill Boulevard and Commonwealth Avenue in La Cañada Flintridge.

Leadership
Rich L. Harris is the President and CEO of CEFCU. In 2010, he was elected to serve as a Board Member at the National Association of Federal Credit Unions (NAFCU). He was elected as NAFCU’s board chairman on 15 June 2016.

Present Chair of the Board of Directors of CEFCU is John Patterson. John has been a committed and dedicated Board Member since 2010. He is currently the Senior Finance Analyst-Public Finance and Investments for the Treasurer and Tax Collector of the County of Los Angeles.

Accredited As Dementia Friendly Establishment
On October 14, 2019, Alzheimer's Los Angeles hosted their first Dementia Friendly Business training for CEFCU. Staff learned the warning signs of dementia, how to effectively communicate and interact with people with dementia, and financial safety. Dementia Friendly Business decals can be found on the front window at each CEFCU office location.

Caltech Y Partnership
The expansion of the Caltech Y and CEFCU’s years long partnership began in 2004, in which the CEFCU funded Caltech Y programs such as the World Fest and other community service programs. CEFCU’s commitment grew further in 2010 with a larger $10,000 grant designated for the Advocating Change Together (ACT) Award and Make-a-Difference Day.

In 2020, the credit union announced a $10,000 matching grant to the Caltech Y to support the Rise and Y-Tutor Program. The matching grant was created by an external funding organization in response to escalating demand for pandemic relief resources for communities hardest hit by the pandemic and made available to member organizations. The credit union applied for the grant, which matched CEFCU’s annual $10,000 contribution to the Caltech Y. In 2021, the external funding organization once again matched CEFCU's contributions. Bringing CEFCU’s total support to $40,000.

CEFCU's support extends to more than just funding. Besides being good neighbors (the CEFCU campus branch is located next door to the Caltech Y office on Wilson Ave), CEFCU staff have partnered and collaborated with the Caltech Y on several programs. CEFCU leadership values social responsibility and actively seeks opportunities to contribute to the overall Caltech community.

References

External links
 

Banks established in 1950
Credit unions based in California
1950 establishments in California